Righteous is the 1994 debut release by North Carolina funk band DAG.

Produced by Grammy nominated record producer and songwriter, John Custer, this work of 1970s-style solid beats and creative imagination received terrific reviews. A quote from VIBE Magazine hailed the album as "...one of the best funk records since 1978. DAG's debut, Righteous, is definitely some of the most ass-grinding grooves you've heard since back in the day." Featured songs include "Sweet Little Lass", "Righteous (City Pain)" and "Lovely Jane". Numerous additional musicians contribute to Righteous, including Muscle Shoals Rhythm Section drummer Roger Hawkins and jazz trumpeter Jeremy Davenport.

Track listing
Intro – 0:25
Sweet Little Lass (Custer) – 4:40
Righteous (City Pain) (Custer/Soule) – 3:37
Your Mama's Eyes (Patterson/Custer) – 4:03
Home (Custer/Dennis) - 3:23
Lovely Jane (Custer) - 4:47
You Can Lick It (If You Try) (Custer) - 5:33
Even So (Custer/Dennis) - 4:16
Plow (Custer/Dennis) - 4:13
Candy (Custer/Dennis/Patterson) - 3:38
Sat. Morning (Custer/Dennis) - 1:05
As (Custer/Dennis) - 3:56
Do Me Good (Custer) - 4:17
Outro (Unnamed Hidden Track) - 0:31

Personnel
 Bobby Patterson: Vocals, Bass, Wah-Wah Guitar
 Brian Dennis: Guitar, Wah-Wah Guitar, Talkbox, Coral Sitar
 Kenny Soule: Drums, Log Drum, Timbales, Tambourine, Cowbell, Glockenspiel
 Doug Jervey: Keyboards, Crumar Orchestrator, Rolands, Vibes, Mini-Moog, Univox Maxi-Korg, Hammond B-3 Organ, Pianos, Background Vocals

Additional musicians
 Jeremy Davenport: Trumpet
 Will Campbell: Alto Saxophone
 Mark Mullins: Trombone
 Lisimba Moyenda: Percussion on "Even So"
 John Custer: Love Unlimited Guitar, T-Wah Guitar
 Clayton Ivey: Hammond B-3 Organ on "Candy"
 Roger Hawkins: Drums, Tambourine, Congas
 Audley Freed: Fadeout Guitar Solo on "Candy"
 Valerie Kashimura: Background Vocals on "As"
 Jewel Bass: Background Vocals on "As"
 Jason Patterson: Drums on "Do Me Good"
 Sean Hepler: The Prospector on "Do Me Good"

References
 Allmusic. [ DAG: Credits]. Retrieved April 27, 2007.
 MySpace (John Custer Recording Studios). DAG: Credits. Retrieved April 27, 2007.
 Last.fm. DAG – Righteous. Retrieved April 13, 2017.

External links
 [ DAG on Allmusic]

DAG (band) albums
1994 debut albums